The Journal of Church and State is a quarterly peer-reviewed academic journal of religious studies and political science, covering issues related to the First Amendment to the United States Constitution . It is published by Oxford University Press on behalf of the J. M. Dawson Institute of Church-State Studies (Baylor University). It was established in 1959. The editor-in-chief is Jerold Waltman (Baylor University).

References

External links 
 

Religious studies journals
Political science journals
Oxford University Press academic journals
Publications established in 1959
English-language journals
Quarterly journals
Church and state law in the United States